Anna Augusta Von Helmholtz-Phelan (September 22, 1880 – January 10, 1964) was an American university professor, author, speaker, poet and social worker. For more than four decades, she taught English and writing at the University of Minnesota, with a specialty in short stories, before retiring in 1949 as assistant professor emeritus of English. Phelan was the author of The Indebtedness of Samuel Taylor Coleridge to August Wilhelm Von Schlegel (1907; originally presented as the author's thesis, University of Wisconsin, 1905), The Social Ideals of William Morris (1908), The Staging of the Court Drama to 1595 (1909), and The Social Philosophy of William Morris (1927). A collection of her poetry was published in The Crystal Cup (1949), the proceeds of which established the "Anna Augusta Von Helmholtz-Phelan Award for Creative Writing" at the University of Minnesota.

Early life and education
Anna Augusta Von Helmholtz was born at Sturgeon Bay, Wisconsin, September 22, 1880. She was the daughter of Otto Wilhelm and Albertine Henriette von Helmholtz, and grand niece of Hermann von Helmholtz, the physicist.

Phelan was educated at Sturgeon Bay High School. At the University of Wisconsin, she made Phi Beta Kappa in her junior year. There, she received her A. B. degree in 1905, with honors; graduate scholar, A. M., 1906; Mary M. Adams Fellow in English literature. She received her Ph.D. at the University of Wisconsin in 1908 while serving as an assistant instructor. Her studies also took her abroad to the University of Oxford, the Sorbonne, and the University of Berlin.

Career
Phelan was a member of the faculty of the University of Minnesota since 1908, first as an instructor in rhetoric and in 1914, as an assistant professor of English. She was the faculty advisor to several school organizations such, Women's Athletic council, Women's League, Equal Suffrage club, Social Problems club and The Players. During her teaching career, Phelan also lectured at St. Catherine's College (now St. Catherine University), Visitation Convent, and at the University of Berlin. After retiring from the University of Minnesota in 1949, Phelan continued teaching creative writing privately.

The author of several non-fiction books, Phelan also published a book of poetry.

Phelan's professional and civic activities including being a member of the Woman's club of Minneapolis, and the state committee to determine minimum wages, as well as several Minneapolis committees including for social survey, vocational survey, child welfare exhibit, organization of the Women's Welfare League, and Mayor's service men's employment. She served as chair of the committee on laws affecting working women (1910–11), the department of social economics (1911–13), the Minnesota Speakers' bureau, and the Council of National Defense. She was a delegate to the American Civic Association, the National Conservation Congresses, and the National Social Center Conference (Madison, Wisconsin, 1911).

She was active in the suffrage movement, promotion of dramatics, and social betterment.

Personal life
On August 10, 1908, in Chicago, she married Raymond V. Phelan.

Phelan was a cat lover; she owned several Persian cats.
In politics, she was a Republican.

Anna Augusta Von Helmholtz-Phelan died at Hennepin, Minnesota, January 10, 1964.

Legacy
At the University of Minnesota, Phelan established the "Anna Augusta Von Helmholtz-Phelan Award for Creative Writing" from the proceeds of her poetry book, The Crystal Cup. Phelan's students established the Anna Augusta Von Helmholtz Phelan Scholarships in Creative Writing.

Selected works
 The Indebtedness of Samuel Taylor Coleridge to August Wilhelm Von Schlegel, 1907
 The Social Ideals of William Morris, 1908
 The Staging of the Court Drama to 1595, 1909
 The Social Philosophy of William Morris, 1927
 The Crystal Cup, 1949

References

External links
 Photo of Dr. Anna Von Helmholtz Phelan at home, in her study, Minneapolis Tribune, January 13, 1935 (via Hennepin County Library Digital Collections).

1880 births
1964 deaths
People from Sturgeon Bay, Wisconsin
University of Wisconsin–Madison alumni
University of Minnesota faculty
20th-century American non-fiction writers
20th-century American poets
20th-century American women writers
American women poets